Søren Schou better known by his stage name Pharfar  is a Danish reggae/dancehall-musician and producer, and known as an award winning producer, solo artist and as part of Bikstok Røgsystem.

Career
He is a self-taught drummer, DJ, producer, singer with roots in the reggae community of Copenhagen.

In 2009, he debuted as an actor in the comedy series Chapper og Pharfar, on the Danish TV-channel DR1.

In 2015 he was featured on a Remix of the song "Traffic Lights" by German singer Lena Meyer-Landrut.

Discography

Singles

References

Danish musicians
Living people
21st-century Danish musicians
Year of birth missing (living people)